Khurram Abbas Sial is a Pakistani politician who was a Member of the Provincial Assembly of the Punjab, from May 2013 to May 2018.

Early life and education
He was born on 14 July 1981.

He has a degree of Bachelor of Arts.

Political career

He was elected to the Provincial Assembly of the Punjab as an independent candidate from Constituency PP-77 (Jhang-V) in 2013 Pakistani general election. He joined Pakistan Muslim League (N) in May 2013.

References

Living people
Punjab MPAs 2013–2018
1981 births
Pakistan Muslim League (N) politicians